Hans Gericke (27 July 1912 – 15 February 2014) was a German architect and urban planner. From 1953 to 1958, he was the deputy director of the Institutes für Theorie und Geschichte der Baukunst for the Deutschen Bauakademie. In 1965, he became the chief architect of East Berlin, East Germany (now Berlin, Germany). For his work, he was awarded by many different organisations. He was born in Magdeburg, Province of Saxony, Prussia, German Empire.

Gericke died on 15 February 2014. He was 101 years old.

References

1912 births
2014 deaths
Architects from Magdeburg
People from the Province of Saxony
Nazi Party members
National Democratic Party of Germany (East Germany) politicians
20th-century German architects
East German architects
German urban planners
German centenarians
Men centenarians
Recipients of the Patriotic Order of Merit in gold